The Phönix C.I, given serial numbers in the Phönix 121 range, was an Austro-Hungarian First World War reconnaissance and general-purpose Biplane built by Phönix and Lloyd.

Development
The Phönix C.I was the first original design developed by the Phönix Flugzeug-Werke It was based on the Hansa-Brandenburg C.II that Phönix was building under licence. A conventional biplane with a rear fuselage/tailplane similar to aircraft designed by Ernst Heinkel. The C.I had a fixed tail-skid landing gear and was powered by a  Hiero 6-cylinder inline piston engine, it had two tandem open cockpits for the pilot and observer/gunner. The company built 110 C.Is and then entered service with the KuKLFT in early 1918. After the First World War 30 aircraft were built by the Swedish Army engineering department fitted with  Benz Bz.IV inline engines.

Designations and serials
Phönix C.I aircraft built by Phönix were serialled from Phönix C.I 121.01 to Phönix C.I 121.160 and Phönix C.I aircraft ordered from Lloyd (Ungarische Lloyd Flugzeug und Motorenfabrik AG) were allocated serials from Phönix C.I(Ll) 49.01 to Phönix C.I(Ll) 49.100. Some 80 aircraft ordered from UFAG were not assigned serial nos, probably due to production being interrupted by the Armistice and 225 more were ordered but not built.

Operators

KuKLFT

Hungarian Air Force - Postwar

Royal Romanian Air Force - Postwar

Royal Swedish Air Force

Yugoslav Royal Air Force - Postwar

Specifications (C.1)

References

Bibliography

External links

Phonix C.1
Phönix C.I Reconnaissance Fighter

1910s Austro-Hungarian military reconnaissance aircraft
Biplanes
Single-engined tractor aircraft
Aircraft first flown in 1918